The 2002 Tro-Bro Léon was the 19th edition of the Tro-Bro Léon cycle race and was held on 2 June 2002. The race was won by Baden Cooke.

General classification

References

2002
2002 in road cycling
2002 in French sport
June 2002 sports events in France